William Sancho Thair (February 20, 1887 – November 28, 1966) was a farmer and political figure in Saskatchewan, Canada. He represented Lumsden in the Legislative Assembly of Saskatchewan from 1944 to 1956 as a Co-operative Commonwealth Federation (CCF) member.  The 1944 election of the CCF was the first socialist government in North America. Among Thair's personal political highlights was introducing legislation which created provincial-wide state-operated crop insurance.  The scheme paid out $2.4 billion for losses in 2021, helping to stabilize the rural economy of Saskatchewan.

He was born near Holstein, Ontario, the son of Philip Franklin Thair and Hannah Maria Mickleborough. He farmed in the Lumsden district from 1910 to 1956. Thair was a member of the United Farmers of Canada and the Saskatchewan Wheat Pool. He served on the local school board for 27 years. In 1915, he married Goldie Traynor.

References 

Saskatchewan Co-operative Commonwealth Federation MLAs
20th-century Canadian politicians
1887 births
1966 deaths